The Automobile et touring club du Québec, operating as CAA-Quebec, is the affiliate club of the Canadian Automobile Association (CAA) which serves members in the Canadian province of Quebec. It is a non-profit organization headquartered in Quebec City.

History 
CAA-Quebec's earliest predecessor was the Automobile Club of Canada founded by Andrew J. Dawes in 1904.  Its first meeting was held on 28 July 1904 at the Windsor Hotel in Montreal, Canada.  On 9 August 1912, Frank Carrel founded the Quebec Automobile Club in Quebec.  Advocacy started from the beginning: members of the Quebec Automobile Club were already lobbying the government for better infrastructure to sustain their new cars.  In 1922, the Quebec Automobile Clubs started offering roadside assistance to its members, and the following year the Montreal club started the same service.  In 1950, the Automobile Club of Canada's main demand was a road crossing the island of Montreal.  This continuing demand paid off, but only at the end of the decade, with the building of the boulevard Métropolitain.  The two clubs of the province began their affiliation with the American Automobile Association (AAA) respectively in 1940 for the Quebec City club and in 1953 for the Montreal club.  This marked the beginning of Trip Tiks (customized planned routes) for members of the Quebec clubs.  The two clubs merged into one entity, the Automobile and Touring club of Quebec, in 1984 and later adopted the brand name CAA-Quebec.  In 2004, it celebrated its 100th year of existence.

Locations 
CAA-Quebec has branches in most major Quebec cities, including Saguenay, Gatineau, Sherbrooke, Trois-Rivieres, Quebec City, Montreal and Laval.  These locations offer services including travel services and membership services (Trip Tiks, Tour Books, etc.)

Roadside assistance 
All service calls are received at the Montreal Contact Centre where call takers enter the information regarding the breakdown into a Computer Aided Dispatch (CAD) software.  Calls are then sent either to the Montreal dispatch centre (it covers the island of Montreal, Laval, the north shore and the south shore) or to the Quebec City dispatch centre (it covers everywhere Montreal dispatch does not).  Services are either done by a CAA-Quebec float truck or by an affiliated station.

References

External links 
Official website

Automobile associations in Canada
Organizations based in Quebec City
1984 establishments in Quebec
Emergency road services